The  is a literary award in Japan.  The prize was founded in 1949 by the Yomiuri Shinbun Company to help form a "strong cultural nation".  The winner is awarded two million Japanese yen and an inkstone.

Award categories
For the first two years, awards were granted in four categories: novels and plays, poetry, literary criticism, and scholarly studies.  In 1950, novels and plays were split to form a total of five categories.  This was further reorganized in 1966 to form six categories: novels, plays, essays and travel journals, criticism and biography, poetry, and academic studies and translation.

Award winners
The Yomiuri Shimbun maintains an official list of current and past prize recipients.

Fiction

Drama

Poetry and haiku

Essay and Travelogue

Criticism and biography

Scholarship and translation

See also
 List of Japanese literary awards

References

External links 
 J'Lit | Awards : Yomiuri Prize for Literature | Books from Japan 
 Japanese Literary Awards at waseda.jp
 Mishima on Japan-101.com 
 Takahashi, Mutsuo on glbtq.com
 Shigehiko Hasumi's award

Japanese literary awards
Awards established in 1948
1948 establishments in Japan
Japanese-language literary awards